Joseph Alan Cagle, known professionally as Joey Allen, is best known as the lead guitarist of the American glam metal band Warrant.

Allen was born as Joseph Alan Cagle on June 23, 1964, in Fort Wayne, Indiana, and grew up in Irvine, California. His father is a retired electronics executive, while his mother worked for the Irvine Unified School District.  He has two older sisters.

Allen played in approximately 20 bands before joining Warrant. He endorses GMP guitars, Hughes and Kettner amplifiers and Dean Markley strings. In an interview, his bandmate and co-guitarist from Warrant Erik Turner states that "Joey is more of a technical player than me. I never really took a lot of lessons or studied. I just learned by jamming with different people, picking up stuff off records, or watching people play live. Joey is a true lead guitarist, and I'm a rhythm guitarist at heart who plays a little bit of lead."

Allen met guitarist Erik Turner in 1979 and they formed the band Knightmare II. Erik Turner says he left the band before the recording of Knightmare II's Death Do Us Part EP. Allen is however on that EP, credited as Joe Kagle 

Allen left the band to attend trade school, earning an associate degree in electronic engineering in 1985. In the meantime, Turner had formed Warrant. Allen joined the band in March 1987.

Allen has a daughter, Kylie Jo, born to he and his first wife in 1991.  He is married to his second wife Shari and has a son, Kallan, who was born in 2012.
  
In 1994, Allen left the band and became a Microsoft Certified Professional and went to work for a software company. During this time, he also played in a band called Joey Allen Project. In an interview in 1999, Joey revealed that it was his decision to leave Warrant. He left as Warrant's style of music was losing popularity because of the Grunge movement and he did not want to go back to playing clubs. He rejoined Warrant in 2004 after ten years away from the band.

Discography

with Knightmare II
 Death Do Us Part EP (1985)

with Warrant
 Dirty Rotten Filthy Stinking Rich (1989)
 Cherry Pie (1990)
 Dog Eat Dog (1992)
 Born Again (2006)
 Rockaholic (2011)
 Louder Harder Faster (2017)

Soundtrack appearances

References 

American heavy metal guitarists
Warrant (American band) members
People from Irvine, California
1964 births
Living people
American male guitarists
20th-century American guitarists
21st-century American guitarists